Battle of Villers-Bretonneux can refer to:

Battle of Amiens (1870) (27 November 1870), also known as the Battle of Villers-Bretonneux, during the Franco-Prussian War
First Battle of Villers-Bretonneux (30 March - 5 April 1918) during World War I
Second Battle of Villers-Bretonneux (24-27 April 1918) during World War I